KIQS (1560 AM) is a radio station licensed to Willows, California, United States. The station is owned by Independence Rock Media Group. Previous owner Thomas F. Huth died in the summer of 2020. This station is rebroadcast on translator K252FN 98.3 FM and their format is Regional Mexican.

External links

IQS
IQS
Willows, California
IQS
1962 establishments in California
Radio stations established in 1962